The 2002 Malé League was the second season of the Malé League.

League table

References
 Maldives 2002, Malé League at RSSSF

Football leagues in the Maldives
Maldives
Maldives
1